Nea Koutali is a municipal unit on the island of Lemnos, North Aegean, Greece. The seat of government is the village of Kontias (population 572 as of the 2011 census), while its next largest town is Nea Koutali with 442 people. Nea Koutali's total population as of 2011 was 2,526.

Subdivisions
Nea Koutali is subdivided into the following communities with their constituent villages shown in brackets:
Angariones
Kallithea
Kontias
Livadochori (Livadochori, Poliochni)
Nea Koutali
Pedino (Neo Pedino, Palaio Pedino, Vounaria)
Portianou
Tsimandria

The municipal unit also includes the island of Vounaria and the uninhabited islands of Alogonisi, which form part of Pedino, as well as the islands of Kastria and Kompi (both part of Tsimandria).

Population

History
The village was built in the area of Agia Marina in 1926 by refugees from the island of Koutali (now Ekinlik) in the Sea of Marmara after the Greco-Turkish War (1919–1922). Together with Agios Dimitrios, it is one of the villages built on Lemnos by refugees from Asia Minor. Initially, it was part of Pesperago (now Pedino). In 1947, the village became an independent community. Nea Koutali stands like an amphitheatre adjacent to the Moudros Gulf and stretches from the pine forests of Agia Triada to the stone built fishing port.

In 1928, Nea Koutali had 351 inhabitants, and a school was built. This school merged with the school in Neo Pedino in 1973. The village was built according to a modern layout and had a population of 500 people in 1938. Its residents included sailors, fishermen and sponge divers. In 1938, they produced 700 oka (900 kg) of sponges. Nea Koutali is still known in Greece and abroad for its sponge production.

Maritime and Sponge Museum

On July 1, 2006, the Maritime and Sponge Museum was opened. It presents the maritime life of the people from Koutali before they fled from Propontis in 1922, through old photographs and artifacts, and tools and machinery related to sponge diving and processing. Also archaeological objects that were collected by sponge divers from Nea Koutali are displayed. These include amphoras, other ceramics, ancient anchors and other small objects which date back to the ancient Greek, Roman and Byzantine periods. They originated from different parts of the Aegean and the Mediterranean including Corinth, Chios, Thasos, Rhodes, Lesbos, but also from the Adriatic Sea coast, northern Spain and Egypt.

Sources 
"Portianou of Lemnos" by Costas Kontellis, 1998.
"Lemnos and its villages" by Th. Belitsos 1994.
Vasiliki Tourptsoglou-Stefanidou, Travels And Geographic Texts On Lemnos Island (15th to 20th Centuries) (Ταξιδιωτικά και γεωγραφικά κείμενα για τη νήσο Λήμνο (15ος-20ος αιώνας), Thessaloniki 1986
Lemnos Province CD Rom (Cdrom Επαρχείου Λήμνου): Lovable Lemnos

See also

List of settlements in the Lemnos regional unit

References

 
Populated places in Lemnos
Populated places established in 1926
Sponge diving